The 1990 Umaglesi Liga was the first and inaugural season of top-tier football in Georgia. It began on 30 March and ended on 12 November 1990. Georgia was still a part of Soviet Union, but the Georgian clubs were withdrawn from the Soviet league system and formed the Georgian league system. Iberia Tbilisi won the championship.

Locations

League standings

Results

Top goalscorers

See also
1990 Pirveli Liga
1990 Georgian Cup

References
Georgia - List of final tables (RSSSF)

Erovnuli Liga seasons
1
Georgia
Georgia